The pterion is the region where the frontal, parietal, temporal, and sphenoid bones join. It is located on the side of the skull, just behind the temple.

Structure 
The pterion is located in the temporal fossa, approximately 2.6 cm behind and 1.3 cm above the posterolateral margin of the frontozygomatic suture.

It is the junction between four bones:
 the parietal bone.
 the squamous part of temporal bone.
 the greater wing of sphenoid bone.
 the frontal bone.

These bones are typically joined by five cranial sutures:
 the sphenoparietal suture joins the sphenoid and parietal bones.
 the coronal suture joins the frontal bone to the sphenoid and parietal bones.
 the squamous suture joins the temporal bone to the sphenoid and parietal bones.
 the sphenofrontal suture joins the sphenoid and frontal bones.
 the sphenosquamosal suture joins the sphenoid and temporal bones.

Clinical significance

Haematoma 
The pterion is known as the weakest part of the skull.  The anterior division of the middle meningeal artery runs underneath the pterion. Consequently, a traumatic blow to the pterion may rupture the middle meningeal artery causing an epidural haematoma. The pterion may also be fractured indirectly by blows to the top or back of the head that place sufficient force on the skull to fracture the pterion.

Surgery 
The pterion is a structural landmark for neurosurgical approach to middle cerebral artery aneurysms.

Etymology 
The pterion receives its name from the Greek root pteron, meaning wing. In Greek mythology, Hermes, messenger of the gods, was enabled to fly by winged sandals, and wings on his head, which were attached at the pterion.

References

External links 

 
 Diagram - look for #24 (source here)

Skull